Maughold is one of the seventeen parishes of the Isle of Man. It is named for St Maughold, the island's patron saint.

It is located on the east of the island (part of the traditional South Side division) in the sheading of Garff. Administratively, part of the historic parish of Maughold is now within Ramsey town. Ballure is another settlement in the parish.

Local government
Since 1865, a small area in the north of the historic parish of Maughold has been part of the separate town of Ramsey, with its own town commissioners.

Since May 2016 the remainder of the historic parish of Maughold has been an electoral ward of a single Garff local authority, formed by merging the former village district of Laxey with the parish districts of Lonan and Maughold.

The Captain of the Parish since 2018 is Clare Christian, a former President of Tynwald.

Politics
Maughold parish is part of the Garff constituency, which elects two members to the House of Keys. Since 1867 Ramsey has formed its own constituency.

History
There is a Neolithic chambered tomb in the parish at Cashtal yn Ard.

Geography
The village of Maughold lies on the coast some three miles south-east of Ramsey. A proportion of the land in the area has been in Manx National Heritage ownership since 1965. Kirk Maughold (the parish church for the area) contains a number of historically important Celtic crosses, suggesting that it was the site of an early Christian monastery. Maughold Head to the east of the village is the easternmost point on the island and has a lighthouse. There are no other significant settlements in the parish, and there is mountainous terrain on the landward side of the parish; the parish includes most of the North Barrule, the second highest hill on the island.

Demographics
The 2016 census of recorded a parish population of 985, an increase of 0.8% from 977 in 2011.

References

External links
Maughold Parish Commissioners - community and local government information (archived)
BBC Domesday Reloaded - Maughold Village (archived)

Parishes of the Isle of Man